Qasel is a sub-district located in Al Udayn District, Ibb Governorate, Yemen. Qasel had a population of 3687 as of 2004.

References 

Sub-districts in Al Udayn District